Count Alessandro Pompei (1705–1772) was an Italian architect and author of a prominent treatise on architecture: Cinque Ordini dell’ Architettura Civile di Michele Sanmicheli or Five Orders of the Civic Architecture of Michele Sanmicheli. Sanmicheli was a prominent venetian architect, who concentrated on solid and often staid government buildings.

Pompei was born in Verona. He studied painting under Antonio Balestra. He helped design the Villa Pindemonte a Vo at Isola della Scala in the province of Verona, and Palazzo Giuliari a Settimo di Gallese in the town of Sessino. In 1747, he designed the Oratorio delle Tre Vie, also known as the Chiesa della Rotonda (Round Church) in Sanguinetto. In Verona, he designed the Dogana, the portico of the Accademia Filarmonica, and the facade of San Paolo. In Bergamo, he designed the library of the Franciscans. Adriano Cristofali was a pupil.

References

Cinque Ordine in Googlebooks
 Li cinque ordini dell' architettura civile di Michel Sanmicheli : rilevati dalle sue fabriche, e descritti e publicati con quelli di Vitruvio, Alberti, Palladio, Scamozzi, Serlio, e Vignola - 2010 facsimile digital edition by the Internet Archive, digitized with funds from Research Library, Getty Research Institute.

1705 births
1772 deaths
18th-century Italian architects
Architects from Verona
Italian architecture writers
Italian male non-fiction writers